Socialist Roots Hi-Fi was a prominent Jamaican reggae sound system and record label owned by Tony Welch (aka Papa Roots) in the 1970s and early 1980s. It was originally named King Attorney (and before that Soul Attorney). The name changed in 1976 when Welch bought the set. Regular deejays included Ranking Trevor, U Brown, Jah Mikey and Nicodemus, alongside the regular selector Danny Dreadlocks. They received dub cuts from Bob Marley & The Wailers. After 1981, the group was known as Papa Roots Hi-Fi.

The sound system was strongly aligned with the Jamaican Peoples National Party and was instrumental in organizing local communities and attempting to promote peace at a time when Jamaica was racked by political violence. Socialist Roots record label released several records. The most successful was "Train to Zion", released in 1976, featuring U Brown and Linval Thompson. The peace song was one of the first 12" 45s issued in Jamaica.

References

Jamaican record labels
Defunct record labels of Jamaica
Reggae record labels
Jamaican sound systems